Brazilian Girls is the first album by the American music group Brazilian Girls. It was released on February 1, 2005 by Verve Records. The album mixes a number of different musical styles, from reggae to samba and house to acid jazz, as well as many different languages, as lead singer Sabina Sciubba goes from English to French, Italian, German and Spanish.

The song "Me gustas cuando callas" ("I like you when you're quiet") is based on a poem by Pablo Neruda, from his well-known 1924 collection Veinte poemas de amor y una canción desesperada, and "Die Gedanken sind frei" ("Thoughts Are Free") is a German protest song about the freedom of thought that became popular with the revolutions of 1848. The French song title "Les sirènes de la fête" means "the Sirens of the party."

Track listing

 "Homme" – 5:21
 "Don't Stop" – 3:51
 "Lazy Lover" – 4:00
 "Les sirènes de la fête" – 4:46
 "Corner Store" – 4:13
 "Long" – 4:47
 "Pussy" – 4:08
 "Die Gedanken sind frei (Thoughts Are Free)" – 4:28
 "All We Have" – 3:46
 "Dance Till the Morning Sun" – 4:38
 "Me gustas cuando callas" – 5:42
 "Ships in the Night" – 3:29

Personnel
 Sabina Sciubba - Vocals
 Till Behler - Saxophone
 Seamus Blake - Saxophone, background vocals
 Takuya Nakamura - Trumpet, background vocals
 Clark Gayton - Trombone, tuba, background vocals
 Didi Gutman - Keyboards, computers
 Jesse Murphy - Bass
 Aaron Johnston - Drums
 Brian Mitchell - Background vocals
 Kenny Wollesen - Background vocals
 Jason Darling - Background vocals
 Anna Hronopoulos - Background vocals
 Hector Castillo - Background vocals
 Alexandra Douglass - Background vocals
 Heather Blanton - Background vocals
 Carlotta Montealegre - Background vocals
 Shruthi Pinnamaneni - Background vocals

Awards
 #40 - woxy.com's 97 best of 2005
 ArtistDirect One of the best albums of 2005

External links 
 Brazilian Girls at Verve Forecast website

Brazilian Girls albums
2005 albums
Verve Records albums